Sol Piccolo (born 11 September 1996) is an Argentine volleyball player who participated with the Argentina national team.

She participated at the 2014 FIVB Volleyball Women's World Championship in Italy, and in the 2015 FIVB Volleyball World Grand Prix.
She played for Vélez Sarsfield in 2014.

Clubs
  Vélez Sarsfield (2014) (Equipo descendido)

References

1996 births
Living people
Argentine women's volleyball players
Place of birth missing (living people)
Volleyball players at the 2015 Pan American Games
Pan American Games competitors for Argentina
Wing spikers